The Reid House is a historic house at 1425 Kavanaugh Street in Little Rock, Arkansas.  It is a large two-story wood-frame structure, built in 1911 in the Dutch Colonial style to a design by architect Charles L. Thompson.  It has a side-gable gambrel roof that extends over the front porch, with shed-roof dormers containing bands of sash windows flanking a large projecting gambreled section.  The porch is supported by stone piers, and extends left of the house to form a porte-cochere.

The house was listed on the National Register of Historic Places in 1982.

See also
National Register of Historic Places listings in Little Rock, Arkansas

References

Houses on the National Register of Historic Places in Arkansas
Colonial Revival architecture in Arkansas
Houses completed in 1911
Houses in Little Rock, Arkansas
National Register of Historic Places in Little Rock, Arkansas
Historic district contributing properties in Arkansas